Gerard William Battersby (born May 15, 1960) is an American prelate of the Roman Catholic Church, serving as an auxiliary bishop for the Archdiocese of Detroit since 2016.

Biography

Early life 
Gerard Battersby was born in Detroit, Michigan, on May 15, 1960, to Christopher and  Helen (Buckley) Battersby. He attended St. Benedict Parish and Lamphere Public Schools in Madison Heights, Michigan. Battersby then entered Wayne State University in Detroit, obtaining a Bachelor of Science degree in biology.  While on a college trip to the British Isles, Battersby said he first realized that he would eventually become a priest“When I was in Ireland, I had an experience over the Easter week — actually I was at a youth hostel in Scotland — and I was musing about my life. One morning I woke up very early and I had what I guess I now would call an illumination: I knew I was going to be a priest.  I had no previous desire or inkling — as a typical Catholic boy that was always somewhere in the background, but it was never in the forefront — but I really felt very strongly that that was the case.Although his original plan was to go to medical school, Battersby decided after graduation to work for a pharmaceutical company.  He later became an appraiser in his father's business. In 1993, Battersby decided to enter seminary.  He graduated from Sacred Heart Major Seminary in Detroit with a Master of Divinity degree in 1998.

Priesthood 
On May 30, 1998, Battersby was ordained by Cardinal Adam Maida to the priesthood for the Archdiocese of Detroit.   Battersby then served as an associate pastor at St. Thecla Parish in Clinton Township, then at three parishes in Detroit: Presentation/Our Lady of Victory, Immaculate Heart of Mary and St. Gerard.

Auxiliary Bishop of Detroit 
On November 23, 2016, Pope Francis appointed Battersby as titular bishop of Eguga and as auxiliary bishop for the Archdiocese of Detroit. On January 25, 2017, Battersby was consecrated by Archbishop Allen Vigneron. Battersby's episcopal lineage dates back through Popes Pius X (1884), Clement XIII (1743), Benedict XIV (1724), and Benedict XIII (1675).

In March 2020, Battersby sent a letter to Father Victor Clore, the pastor of Christ the King Parish in Detroit.  It said that the local support group for families of LGBTQ Catholics, Fortunate Families, was forbidden to meet at his church, or other church facility in the archdiocese.  The letter also said that the group must discontinue its claim to be "Catholic operating in the Archdiocese of Detroit". Battersby wrote that the group's dissent from Catholic teaching presented a danger to their membership. He suggested that their members join with EnCourage, an approved ministry operating in the archdiocese.

See also

 Catholic Church hierarchy
 Catholic Church in the United States
 Historical list of the Catholic bishops of the United States
 List of Catholic bishops of the United States
 Lists of patriarchs, archbishops, and bishops

References

External links

Roman Catholic Archdiocese of Detroit

1960 births
Living people
Clergy from Detroit
21st-century Roman Catholic bishops in the United States
Bishops appointed by Pope Francis